Guido Andreozzi and Andrés Molteni were the defending champions but only Andreozzi chose to defend his title, partnering Sergio Galdós. Andreozzi lost in the first round to Alessandro Giannessi and Gianluca Mager.

James Cerretani and Max Schnur won the title after defeating Denys Molchanov and Franko Škugor 6–3, 3–6, [10–6] in the final.

Seeds

Draw

References
 Main Draw

Città di Caltanissetta - Doubles
2017 Doubles